Parthena is a Greek feminine name. Notable people with this name include:
Parthena M. Blank, one of the namesakes of the historic Stephen and Parthena M. Blank House in Oregon
Parthena Garcos, fictional character in 1950 film noir Thieves' Highway
Parthena Horozidou, Greek actress, competitor in Your Face Sounds Familiar (Greek series 4)
Parthena Katsaounis, Greek-American statistician
Parthena Sarafidis, Austrian figure skater

See also
Mikri Vigla, a Greek island village with a nearby beach named Parthena